Chaqmaqtin Lake is a lake in the Wakhan region of Afghanistan.  It lies at an elevation of about 4,024 m in the Little Pamir.  It extends for about 9 km and is about 2 km wide. 

Chaqmaqtin Lake lies towards the western end of the Little Pamir valley. The Aksu or Murghab River flows east from the lake through the Little Pamir to enter Tajikistan at the eastern end of the valley.  The Bozai Darya (also known as the Little Pamir River) rises a short distance west of the lake and flows 15km west to join the Wakhjir River and form the Wakhan River near the settlement of Bozai Gumbaz. Some accounts state that the Bozai Darya also rises from Chaqmaqtin Lake.  Another source calls the lake "a deeper and possibly marshy section within the Aq Su-Little Pamir River drainage divide".

The lake is a glacier basin lake formed when the ice was once very thick here before it melted away a few thousand years ago.

References 

Lakes of Afghanistan
Wakhan
Landforms of Badakhshan Province